Combin may refer to:

 Néstor Combin
 COMBIN, various computer implementations of the mathematical sets-and-their-subsets-related "combinations" function

See also 
 Peaks in Pennine Alps of Switzerland:
 Grand Combin
 Petit Combin
 Combin de Corbassière
 Combin de Valsorey
 Combin de Boveire
 Combin de la Tsessette